Kāohikaipu (also known as Black Rock) is an islet located in Honolulu County, Hawaii. It is situated 0.6 miles away from nearby Mānana Island (Rabbit Island). The total size of Kāohikaipu is 11 acres.

Its formation was due to the Honolulu Volcanic Series, which were a series of eruptions by the Koʻolau Range that created numerous vents near Honolulu such as Diamond Head. Both Kāohikaipu and Mānana Island are northeast of Makapuʻu Point. 

The islet is wildlife sanctuary for birds and a permit is needed for people to access it.

See also 

 Mānana (Rabbit Island)
 Honolulu Volcanics
 Makapuʻu

References 

Geography of Honolulu County, Hawaii
Volcanoes of Hawaii
Islands of Hawaii